Chat-Köl is a village in the Chüy Region of Kyrgyzstan. Its population was 3,414 in 2021. The village was established by migrants from northern Kazakhstan and Siberia in 1926, who settled down in a steppe among swampy areas with reeds.

References

Populated places in Chüy Region